White Hall Plantation House is an 1840s Italianate and Greek Revival plantation house attributed to the architect Henry Howard and built in 1848-49 by Elias Norwood.  It is located in Legonier, a hamlet on the east bank of the Atchafalaya River, today part of the unincorporated town of Lettsworth, Louisiana.  White Hall's most notable owner and slaveholder was Bennet Barton Simmes (1811–1888), founder of Simmesport, state senator, and contributor to the Louisiana Articles of Secession prior to the Civil War. He is also said to have been a steamboat captain and Confederate general. The home is listed on the National Register of Historic Places.

Union General Nathaniel P. Banks used the house as a military headquarters in 1863. During the 20th century, the mansion was twice moved back from the encroaching river waters. In late 2013, after a decade of restoration work, the White Hall Plantation & Gardens were opened to public view for the first time.

See also
National Register of Historic Places listings in Pointe Coupee Parish, Louisiana

References 

((Country Roads magazine, February 2014))

Houses completed in 1849
Plantation houses in Louisiana
Italianate architecture in Louisiana
Houses on the National Register of Historic Places in Louisiana
Houses in Pointe Coupee Parish, Louisiana
1849 establishments in Louisiana
National Register of Historic Places in Pointe Coupee Parish, Louisiana